Dariusz Paweł Kotwica (born 1986), known as the Euro Ripper, is an itinerant Polish criminal and serial killer, responsible for at least three murders of pensioners in Austria and Sweden. Described as the "first European serial killer" who travelled using open borders, he is thought to be responsible for additional murders in the Netherlands, Czech Republic and the United Kingdom. The mentally-ill Kotwica is currently in a treatment center in Göllersdorf.

Biography

Early life
Kotwica grew up in Metalchem, a housing estate on the outskirts of Opole. Although described as an average, normal guy, he was known around the area for always wearing a tracksuit when walking around the blocks. Dariusz was raised solely by his mother, and never met his father. Despite his failing grades in school and truancy, Kotwica was considered very intelligent, and was notably interested in Greek mythology. Sometime around 2005, he left his native Poland and began travelling around Europe, first settling to live in England for several years.

Crimes
Prior to his murders, Kotwica seriously injured an unknown person in the Netherlands in 2011, attempted to murder a shopkeeper in Salzburg in 2012 after failing to shoplift, and robbed a grocery in Germany in January 2015.

In April 2015, he mercilessly stabbed to death 79-year-old Swedish pensioner Bo Georg Ehrlander in the man's kitchen using a knife. Ehrlander was later found lying on the floor of his Saltholmen home. His car keys were also found to be missing.

Only a month later, on 21 May, Kotwica broke into the home of 75-year-old local politician Gerhard Hintermeier and his 74-year-old wife, Erna. Both were brutally battered and stabbed, with Kotwica raping Erna before killing her. He then proceeded to write the phrase "Tantum ergo" on her body with brown paint.

Capture, trial and sentence
The now-internationally wanted Pole was arrested on 8 June at a railway station in Düsseldorf, after he was recorded using the dead couple's ATM card on surveillance cameras. He was quickly extradited back to Austria, he quickly confessed to committing the double murder, as well as the killing of Ehrlander, whose car keys were found in Kotwica's possession. When questioned on his motive, Kotwica confessed that he felt "joy" when torturing his entirely innocent and randomly-selected victims.

Dariusz Kotwica was soon sent to court, where he claimed that his "inner voices" were telling him to kill. Psychiatrists thoroughly examined him, concluding that he has had paranoid schizophrenia for at least 10 years. Kotwica was found guilty and convicted of murdering the Hintermeiers and Ehrlander, but as a result of his mental illness, was transferred to a treatment center in Göllersdorf, where he is currently housed.

See also
List of serial killers by country

References

1986 births
Living people
Male serial killers
People convicted of murder by Austria
People convicted of murder by Sweden
People from Opole
People with schizophrenia
Polish expatriates in England
Polish people imprisoned abroad
Polish rapists
Polish serial killers